Battle Royal at the Albert Hall was a live professional wrestling event produced by the World Wrestling Federation (WWF) that took place on 3 October 1991 at the Royal Albert Hall in London, England. The event was televised on Sky Movies Plus and later released on VHS and DVD. On 5 February 2018 the event became available on the WWE Network.

The main event was a 20-man battle royal which was won by The British Bulldog, last eliminating Typhoon. The other matches were singles matches, and tag team matches, including a tag team match for the WWF Tag Team Championship.

Background
The main feature of this event was the 20-man battle royal, in which The British Bulldog won. 'Lord' Alfred Hayes provided guest commentary for the contest.

Results

Battle Royal

Legacy
This event is significant for featuring one of Andre The Giant's last live wrestling appearances and the last on videotape or DVD before his death in January 1993. Andre arrives at the end of the Battle Royal to save winner British Bulldog from an attack by the Natural Disasters,  Earthquake and Typhoon.

See also

1991 in professional wrestling
Professional wrestling in the United Kingdom

References

1991 in professional wrestling
Events in London
WWE shows
Professional wrestling in England
1991 in London
October 1991 events in the United Kingdom
Professional wrestling battle royales
WWE in the United Kingdom